The Center for Economic and Policy Research (CEPR) is a left-leaning American think tank that specializes in economic policy. Based in Washington, D.C.  CEPR was co-founded by economists Dean Baker and Mark Weisbrot in 1999.

Considered a left-leaning organization, notable CEPR contributors include Nobel Memorial Prize in Economic Sciences recipients Joseph Stiglitz and Robert Solow.

History 
Politically, CEPR has been described as both progressive and left-leaning. CEPR contributors include Nobel Memorial Prize in Economic Sciences recipients Joseph Stiglitz and Robert Solow.

Issues

United States

Healthcare 
CEPR supports the Affordable Care Act (ACA) stating that it is "a family-friendly policy" and that the policy "has allowed thousands of workers to voluntarily reduce their work hours to care for children or elderly parents, or to explore new opportunities." Despite the increase in the percentage of workers employed on a part-time basis, CEPR concluded that such statistics were not sufficient to make any overall judgments on the health of the labor market.

Employment 
CEPR backs alongside the Economic Policy Institute (EPI) the Full Employment Caucus, a group on United States House officials that advocate for full employment in the United States.

Minimum wage 
A 2014 study by CEPR shows that 13 states that increased their minimum wage had an average payroll of 0.99% compared to 0.68% in other states, though the CEPR stated the analysis was "far from scientific". In response to criticism of President Joe Biden's support for a $15 minimum wage, Baker calculated that, had wages risen alongside increases in productivity since 1968, the minimum wage would be around $24 an hour. This was later revised to $21.50 per hour on March 16, 2022, after a spreadsheet error was found and corrected.

Taxes 
In a 2014 report in Fortune, CEPR co-founder Dean Baker suggested that according to poll findings, many citizens of the United States did not notice a 2% increase in their Social Security tax.

Latin America 

CEPR has been supportive of left-leaning governments in South America.

Brazil 
In 2008, Brazilian Foreign Secretary Celso Amorim cited CEPR's work to explain why Brazil had no interest in signing a free trade agreement with the United States. He said that the CEPR report concluded that the most severe impacts from the financial crisis of 2007–08 would be suffered by those economies most integrated to United States, those that have free trade agreements with the US.

Venezuela 
CEPR and its founder Mark Weisbrot have analysed and often written about the crisis in Venezuela. In an October 2012 op-ed for The New York Times, Weisbrot wrote that "[a]lthough some media have talked of Venezuela’s impending economic collapse for more than a decade, it hasn’t happened and is not likely to happen." In a July 2014 article for Fortune, Weisbrot said the Venezuelan economy had performed well for the period from 2004, when the government gained control of the oil industry from the opposition, to 2012. He said the problems which commenced in 2012 were mainly due to Venezuela's exchange rate system. In a June 2016 article in The New York Times, Weisbrot wrote that "Washington has caused enormous damage to Venezuela in its relentless pursuit of 'regime change' for the last 15 years." He suggested the US end its intervention, which involved economic sanctions, funding of opposition groups and refusal to accept presidential election results.

Bolivia 
in 2019, CEPR criticized the Organization of American States (OAS)'s audit of the 2019 Bolivian general election, which concluded that the results of the elections should be voided because there were "drastic and hard-to-explain change in the trend of the preliminary results after the closing of the polls". Weisbrot wrote that the report "provides absolutely no evidence — no statistics, numbers, or facts of any kind — to support this idea", and called on the OAS to retract its press release. 

CEPR commissioned researchers at the MIT Election Data and Science Lab, John Curiel and Jack R. Williams, to independently verify their work on the 2019 Bolivian election. The MIT researchers published a statistical analysis on 27 February 2020, confirming the results of the CEPR study and finding that there was no "statistical evidence of fraud that we can find — the trends in the preliminary count, the lack of any big jump in support for Morales after the halt, and the size of Morales’s margin all appear legitimate. All in all, the OAS's statistical analysis and conclusions would appear deeply flawed" and that "it is highly likely that Morales surpassed the 10-percentage-point margin in the first round" as originally presented. The OAS dismissed the report as "neither honest, nor fact-based nor comprehensive" and called it "unscientific". Two Bolivian economists writing for Project Syndicate also argued that the study's assumptions were questionable for methodological reasons.

Personnel 
CEPR's staff includes Ha-Joon Chang, Eileen Appelbaum,  John Schmitt and Deborah James.

CEPR contributors include Advisory Board Members Joseph Stiglitz and Robert Solow.

As of 2017, CEPR's Board of Directors includes:

 Dean Baker
 Walden Bello
 Chuck Collins
 Teresa Ghilarducci
 Danny Glover

 Robert Pollin
Julian Bond served as CEPR's Board Chair in the past.

References

External links 
 CEPR website

 
Non-profit organizations based in Washington, D.C.
Political and economic think tanks in the United States
Think tanks established in 1999
Progressive organizations in the United States
1999 establishments in Washington, D.C.